Paolo Pasko (born Paolo Pascolat, 31 October 1969) also known as Pasko, is an Italian singer-songwriter and musician.  He primarily composes electronica and popular music. His solo work has been influenced by a variety of musical styles and genres, including avant-garde, ambient, electronic and progressive rock.

His first album, Experiments (EP), was released in September 2012. After that, the single "Rebirthing" was published in October 2012. It is still his most played radio song. His first POP song was "E' solo un'Emozione", with lyrics in Italian (the English version is "Emotional Leaving", published in 2015).

Discography

EPs

Experiments (2012)
Emotional Leaving (2015)

Singles

E' solo un'emozione (2013)
Gravity Zero (2014)
 Il domani (Tomorrow) (2014)
 A Special Mind (2014)
 Quando Penso Che  (2014)
 Un sogno di una notte  (2015)

References

External links
 

Italian musicians
1969 births
Living people